"Reload" is a song by British grime artist Wiley, featuring vocals by Chip and uncredited vocals by Ms D. It was released as the third single from his ninth studio album The Ascent on 15 February 2013 for digital download in the United Kingdom. The song was written by Richard Cowie, Jahmaal Fyffe, Dayo Olatunji, Talay Riley and produced by Scribz. It was the first single to feature Chipmunk's new stage name, Chip, and the last single when Ms. D was known as such, to which she then changed to Dyo.

Music video
A music video to accompany the release of "Reload" was first released onto YouTube on 28 January 2013 at a total length of three minutes and seventeen seconds.

Track listing

Credits and personnel
 Vocals – Wiley, Chip, Ms D
 Producer – Scribz
 Lyrics – Richard Cowie, Jahmaal Fyffe, Dayo Olatunji, Talay Riley
 Label: Warner Music

Charts

Weekly charts

Year-end charts

Certifications

Release history

References

2013 songs
2013 singles
Wiley (musician) songs
Chipmunk (rapper) songs
Songs written by Talay Riley
Drum and bass songs
Warner Records singles